Adampur is a small village in Pratapgarh district, Uttar Pradesh, India.

It is situated at the bank of Sai River (a tributary of River Ganges).  Adampur's nearest market is Rasooli Bazar and Kithawar Bazar.

Railway station
Its nearest railway station is Antu which is 15 km away.

References

Villages in Pratapgarh district, Uttar Pradesh